Carlos Ayrton Cougo Rivero (born 15 June 1996) is a Uruguayan footballer who plays as left back for Brazilian club Avaí, on loan from Paraguayan club Libertad.

Club career
Cougo was born in Melo, and joined Defensor Sporting's youth setup at the age of 15. He made his first team debut on 14 February 2016, starting in a 1–3 home loss against Racing Montevideo.

Cougo subsequently became a regular starter, and signed for Paraguayan club Libertad on 2 January 2019, after the club bought 50% of his economic rights for a US$ 1.5 million fee. On 31 December, however, he returned to his home country after agreeing to a one-year loan deal with Nacional.

Back to Libertad for the 2021 season, Cougo again failed to establish himself as a starter, and was loaned to Campeonato Brasileiro Série A side Avaí on 21 January 2022.

Career statistics

References

1996 births
Living people
People from Melo, Uruguay
Uruguayan footballers
Association football defenders
Uruguayan Primera División players
Paraguayan Primera División players
Defensor Sporting players
Club Libertad footballers
Club Nacional de Football players
Avaí FC players
Uruguayan expatriate footballers
Uruguayan expatriate sportspeople in Paraguay
Uruguayan expatriate sportspeople in Brazil
Expatriate footballers in Paraguay
Expatriate footballers in Brazil